Jordan Kos (born June 25, 2000) is a female international Canadian lawn bowler.

Personal
Kos started lawn bowling at the Regina Lawn Bowling Club in May, 2008 at the age of 7 years.  Kos became a member of the Development Squad of Team Canada in 2014, at the age of 14 years - the youngest player every to do so.  Kos became a member of the High Performance, Senior Squad, Team Canada in 2016.  Kos is currently attending the University of Regina, Faculty of Education and Faculty of Arts History.

Bowls Career

Commonwealth Games
Kos was selected to represent Canada at the 2022 Commonwealth Games held in Birmingham, England. She competed in the women's singles and the women's pairs (as skip). This was Kos' debut appearance at the Commonwealth Games.

Asia Pacific
Kos won a bronze medal in the triples with Jacqueline Foster and Leanne Chinery at the 2019 Asia Pacific Bowls Championships, held in the Gold Coast, Queensland.

World Championships
In 2020 Kos was selected for the 2020 World Outdoor Bowls Championship in Australia which will now take place in September, 2021. Jordan will skip the Pairs team with Joanna Cooper as Lead and will vice the Triples team with Leanne Chinery as skip and Jackie Foster as lead.

International Competitions
2022 - Selected to the Commonwealth Games Team.  Singles. Skipping Pairs with Jackie Foster from Nova Scotia.
2019 - Multi Nations Tournament - Selected to Represent Canada.  Vice for Women's Fours.  Vice for Women's Triples.
2019 - US Open - Sun City, Arizona.  Runner Up in the Championship Flights for Women's Fours, Women's Pairs, Women's Singles.  Female Player of the Tournament.
2019 - US Open - Bowler of the Tournament  https://www.lawnbowlingusopen.com/2019-results
2018 - Competed in the US Open in Sun City, Arizona.  Finished 1st in Flight 4 in Women's Fours. Finished 2nd in Flight 1 in Women's Pairs.
2018 - Competed in the NAC (North American Challenge), Laguna Hills, California. Team Jarvis. Competed in Women's Pairs and Women's Fours.
2018 - Represented Canada in Cardiff, Wales at the 10 Nations Test Match.  Competed in Women's Triples and Women's Singles.
2017 - Represented Canada in the 8 Nations Event in Broadbeach, Australia.
2016 - Represented Canada in the NAC (North American Challenge), Vancouver, BC. Team Folkins. Competed in Women's Fours and Women's Pairs.
2015 - Silver Medal - 18th Annual Tiger Bowls and China Open.  Women's Fours.
2014 - Represented Canada in the NAC (North American Challenge), Arizona.

National Competitions
2022 - Gold Medal - Women's Singles (Burlington)  |  Kos will represent Canada at the World Singles Champion of Champions in November 2023, scheduled to be hosted at the Naenae Bowls Club, Lower Hutt, Wellington, New Zealand
2022 - Silver Medal - Women's Fours (Burlington)
2019 - Bronze Medal - Women's Singles (Kitchener)
2019 - Bronze Medal - Women's U25 (Victoria)
2018 - Silver Medal - Women's U25 (Winnipeg)
2018 - Bronze Medal - Women's Fours (Regina)
2017 - Silver Medal - Women's Singles (Winnipeg)
2017 - Gold Medal - Women's U18 (Halifax)
2017 - Gold Medal - Forster-Lang Pairs (Halifax)
2016 - Silver Medal - Woman's Singles (Vancouver)
2016 - Silver Medal - Women's Fours (Edmonton)
2015 - 3rd after Round Robin - Women's Singles (Winnipeg)
2015 - Gold Medal - Forster-Lang Pairs (Saskatoon)
2015 - Gold Medal - Women's U18 (Saskatoon)
2014 - Gold Medal - Women's Fours (Ontario)
2014 - Silver Medal - Women's U18 (Etobicoke)
2013 - Gold Medal - Forster-Lang Pairs (New Brunswick)
2013 - 4th Place - Women's U18 (New Brunswick)
2012 - Women's U18 (Kelona)
2012 - Women's U18 (Kelona) won Player of the Tournament
2011 - Women's U18 - 1st National Tournament (Montreal)

Provincial Playdowns
2022 - Gold Medal - Women's Outdoor Singles
2022 - Gold Medal - Women's Fours
2019 - Gold Medal - Women's U25
2019 - Silver Medal - Women's Singles
2018 - Gold Medal - Women's Fours
2017 - Gold Medal - Women's Singles
2017 - Gold Medal - Women's U18
2017 - Gold Medal - Women's Fours
2016 - Bronze Medal - Women's Singles
2016 - Gold Medal - Women's U18
2016 - Silver Medal - Women's Pairs
2016 - Gold Medal - Women's Fours
2015 - Gold Medal - Women's U18
2015 - Silver Medal - Mixed Pairs
2015 - Gold Medal - Women's Pairs
2015 - Silver Medal - Women's Fours
2014 - Gold Medal - Women's U18
2014 - Gold Medal - Women's Fours
2014 - Bronze Medal - Women's Pairs
2013 - Gold Medal - Women's U18
2012 - Gold Medal - Women's U18
2011 - Gold Medal - Women's U18
2010 - Silver Medal - Women's U18

Local
2022 - New Zealand 5s - 1st place - Regina Lawn Bowling Club
2021 - Singles Club Champion - Regina Lawn Bowling Club
2021 - Women's Singles Club Champion - Regina Lawn Bowling Club
2021 - Women's Pairs Provincial Champion - Skip Jean Roney, Lead Jordan Kos
2021 - Mixed Pairs Provincial Champion - Skip Carter Watson, Lead Jordan Kos
2014 - Gold Medal - Women's Champion - Regina Lawn Bowling Club
2014 - Gold Medal - Club Champion - Regina Lawn Bowling Club

Other
2018 - Youth Female Athlete of the Year Finalist - Province of Saskatchewan
2017 - Nominated for the Sask Sport Youth Athlete of the Year by Bowls Sask
2016 - Nominated for the Sask Sport Youth Athlete of the Month for September.
2016 - CTV Athlete of the Week (August 29, 2016) with Carter Watson

Bowls
Taylor Ace - Size 3 - Raspberry Ripple
Taylor Ace - Size 3 - Pink & White Speckle
Taylor Ace - Size 3 - Yellow & White Speckle
Taylor Ace - Size 3 - Navy Blue and Light Blue Speckle (Commonwealth Games 2022 Bowls)
Taylor Ace - Size 3 - Red (Commonwealth Games 2022 Bowls)
Taylor Redline - Size 3 - Red
Henselite Dreamline XG - Size 3 - Joker (Orange/Black/Violet/Pink)
Tiger - Size 3 - Marine

Team Canada
2021 - 2022 - Contract Extended - High Performance Squad, Team Canada
2018 - 2021 - Selected to the High Performance Squad, Team Canada
2016 - 2018 - Selected to the High Performance Squad, Team Canada
2015 - 2016 - Selected to the Development Squad, Team Canada

Media Appearances
2023 - SaskToday - Sports This Week:  Regina's Kos among best lawn bowlers in Canada by Calvin Daniels  | https://www.sasktoday.ca/central/local-sports/sports-this-week-reginas-kos-among-best-lawn-bowlers-in-canada-6357819/
2022 - Locker Talk Interview - synopsis of Commonwealth Games and Canadian National Events
2022 - Jordan Kos v Joanna Cooper - 2022 Semi Final - Singles  |  https://www.youtube.com/watch?v=ol3Qrv8AWN4&t=15017s
2022 - Interview with the University of Regina - 10 questions with Jordan Kos, U of R student and national champion lawn bowler  |  https://www.uregina.ca/external/communications/feature-stories/current/2022/09-01.html
2022 - Interview with Global News (Commonwealth Games 2022 Experience)  |   https://globalnews.ca/news/9054209/lawn-bowling-regina-jordan-kos-commonwealth-games/
2022 - Locker Talk Interview
2021 - Locker Talk Interview
2021 - CTV Morning Live Interview
2021 - Talk of the Town Interview
2021 - Interview with Fox News (Emily Fulford and Skycron, an affiliate of Fox News)
2019 - Global TV - Live Morning Segment at the RLBC
2019 - CTV Morning Live
2019 - Talk of the Town
2019 - https://globalnews.ca/news/5362482/lawn-bowling-club-regina/
2018 - Appeared at the Government of Saskatchewan  Legislative Assembly
2018 - http://www.ilawnbowl.com/the-spirit-award/
2018 - https://biasedbowls.ca/2020/09/11/bowls-in-the-age-of-covid-19-checking-in-with-the-youth-squad/
2018 - Locker Talk
2017 - CBC Vignette
2017 - Talk of the Town
2017 - Leader Post Article
2017 - https://www.wlbowl.ca/youth/
2015 - Global TV Field Trippin
2015 - CTV Noon Show
2015 - https://leaderpost.com/sports/regina-teen-has-right-touch-on-the-green

References

External links
 Jordan Kos at Bowls Canada

2000 births
Living people
Canadian female bowls players
Commonwealth Games competitors for Canada
Bowls players at the 2022 Commonwealth Games
21st-century Canadian women